My Secret Heart may refer to:

My Secret Heart, 2008 composition by Mira Calix
My Secret Heart: Songs of the Parlour, Stage and Silver Screen, album by Ben Heppner
"My Secret Heart", song by Kylie Minogue from Enjoy Yourself